Gary Stuart Hackett (born 11 October 1962) is a former footballer who played in the Football League for Chester City, Peterborough United, Shrewsbury Town, Stoke City and West Bromwich Albion.

Career
Hackett was born in Stourbridge and began his career with non-league Bromsgrove Rovers before joining Football League side Shrewsbury Town. Hackett played regularly under Chic Bates helping the "Shrews" punch above their weight in the Second Division. After playing 174 times scoring 20 goals for Shrewsbury he joined Scottish Premier Division side Aberdeen in the summer of 1987. He spent the first half of the 1987–88 season at Pittodrie before moving back to England with Stoke City. Under the management of Mick Mills Hackett was an ever-present in 1988–89 playing all of the club's 52 fixtures that season as Stoke finished in a poor mid-table position of 13th. He was sold to West Bromwich Albion in March 1990 with Stoke destined for relegation to the Third Division.

He was never able to establish himself with the "Baggies" making 50 appearances in four seasons which ended with promotion in 1992–93. He ended his career with a season each at Peterborough United and Chester City before entering non-league football with Halesowen Town.

In 2003, Hackett was named co-manager of his hometown club Stourbridge alongside Jon Ford, but became the sole manager in 2005 with Ford as his assistant. Stourbridge won promotion to the Southern League Premier Division with two promotions in three seasons under Hackett's management, as well as reaching the FA Cup proper rounds for the first time in the club's history. In May 2019 Hackett announced he was resigning as manager after sixteen years in charge, following Stourbridge's defeat to Alvechurch in the Southern League play-off semi final.

Career statistics
Source:

A.  The "Other" column constitutes appearances and goals in the Anglo-Italian Cup, Full Members Cup, Football League Trophy, UEFA Cup.

References

External links
 
 Halesowen Town FC Profile
 Stourbridge FC Profile

1962 births
Living people
Sportspeople from Stourbridge
Association football wingers
English footballers
Bromsgrove Rovers F.C. players
Shrewsbury Town F.C. players
Aberdeen F.C. players
Stoke City F.C. players
West Bromwich Albion F.C. players
Peterborough United F.C. players
Chester City F.C. players
Halesowen Town F.C. players
English Football League players
Scottish Football League players
English football managers
Stourbridge F.C. managers